The Security Printing Corporation (Bangladesh) Ltd. (SPCBL) is the main printer of banknotes and government postal stamps in Bangladesh. Established in 1988, it started its operation initially as a project of the Bangladesh Bank. Since April 1992 it is running its business as an autonomous organization constituted under the existing law of the country. It is the regular member of International Government Printers Association. Its clients for high quality four colour postage stamps include Nepal.

The corporation's 25th anniversary in 2013 was commemorated by the Bangladesh Bank issuing a ৳25 note showing its headquarters on the reverse.

Products

Currency & banknotes of all denominations
1 Taka, 2 Taka BB, 2 Taka Doel, 5 Taka BB
5 Taka Old, 5 Taka, 10 Taka BB Old, 10 Taka BB
10 Taka Old, 10 Taka Odl1, 20 Taka BB, 20 Taka Old
50 Taka BB, 50 Taka Old, 50 Taka Old1,70 Taka, 100 Taka BB N
100 Taka BB O, 100 Taka Old, 100 Taka Old1, 100 Taka
500 Taka BB N, 500 Taka BB O, 500 Taka O, 500 Taka O1
1000 Taka BB N, 1000 Taka O,
Prizebond, 25 Taka, 40 Taka, 60 Taka,
Others
Postal & revenue stamps
Postal Envelopes
Postcards
Non-judicial stamps
Court fee stamps
Cheque books & other security items of schedule & private banks
Share certificates
Treasury bonds
Academic certificates
Biri band rolls (tax label)
Stamps & band for cigarette boxes (tax label)
Sleeve for Mineral water & Soft drinks bottle (tax label)
Band for Toilet soap packets (tax label)
Tax label for vehicle route permits, vehicle fitness & vehicle tax
OMR (Optical Mark Reader) form

See also
 Bangladesh Ordnance Factories
 Bangladesh Machine Tools Factory

References

External links
 Official Site of The Security Printing Corporation (Bangladesh) Ltd.
 List of the directors and chairmans of the managing department 

Banks established in 1988
Government-owned companies of Bangladesh
Banknote printing companies
Ministry of Finance (Bangladesh)